MBC Sports+ (MBC 스포츠+, 엠비씨 스포츠 플러스) is a South Korean pay television network, which is well known for its sports broadcasting.

Contents 
This is one of the Korean pay television channels that specialise in broadcasting sports. It is a subsidiary of the MBC Plus.

External links 
 Official Website 

Munhwa Broadcasting Corporation television networks
Television channels in South Korea
Korean-language television stations
Television channels and stations established in 2001
Sports television networks in South Korea